Allan Jensen (31 August 1922 – 24 February 2003) was an Australian rules footballer who played with Hawthorn in the Victorian Football League (VFL).

Jensen, a Hawthorn Colts player, made one VFL appearance in 1943 and a further 11 in the 1944 season. In 1945 he joined Camberwell.

References

1922 births
Australian rules footballers from Victoria (Australia)
Hawthorn Football Club players
Camberwell Football Club players
2003 deaths